Ageneotettix is a genus of slant-faced grasshoppers in the family Acrididae. There are at least three described species in Ageneotettix.

Species
These three species belong to the genus Ageneotettix:
 Ageneotettix brevipennis (Bruner, 1904) (short-wing big-headed grasshopper)
 Ageneotettix deorum (Scudder, 1876) (white-whiskered grasshopper)
 Ageneotettix salutator (Rehn, 1927)

References

Further reading

 
 
 

Gomphocerinae
Articles created by Qbugbot
Acrididae genera